Emeric, also known as Henry or Imre (117430 November 1204), was King of Hungary and Croatia between 1196 and 1204. In 1184, his father, Béla III of Hungary, ordered that he be crowned king, and appointed him as ruler of Croatia and Dalmatia around 1195. Emeric ascended the throne after the death of his father. During the first four years of his reign, he fought his rebellious brother, Andrew, who forced Emeric to make him ruler of Croatia and Dalmatia as appanage.

Emeric cooperated with the Holy See against the Bosnian Church, which the Catholic Church considered to be heretical. Taking advantage of a civil war, Emeric expanded his suzerainty over Serbia. He failed to prevent the Republic of Venice, which was assisted by crusaders of the Fourth Crusade, from seizing Zadar in 1202. He also could not impede the rise of Bulgaria along the southern frontiers of his kingdom. Emeric was the first Hungarian monarch to use the "Árpád stripes" as his personal coat of arms and to adopt the title of King of Serbia. Before his death, Emeric had his four-year-old son, Ladislaus III, crowned king.

Early life (1174–1196)

Emeric was the eldest child of Béla III of Hungary and Béla's first wife, Agnes of Antioch. His tutor was an Italian priest, Bernard. Nicholas, Archbishop of Esztergom, crowned the eight-year-old Emeric king on 16 May 1182, which confirmed Emeric's right to succeed his father. Emeric was betrothed to a daughter of Holy Roman Emperor Frederick I, but she died in 1184. Béla III appointed Emeric to administer Croatia and Dalmatia around 1195.

Reign

Struggles with his brother (1196–1200)

Emeric succeeded his father, who died on 23 April 1196. Béla III had bequeathed estates and money to Emeric's younger brother, Andrew, under the condition that Andrew should lead a crusade to the Holy Land. Instead, Andrew turned against Emeric, demanding a separate duchy for himself in 1197. Leopold VI, Duke of Austria, intervened on behalf of Andrew, and at the end of the year, their combined forces routed Emeric's troops at Mački, Slavonia. In early 1198, Emeric was forced to make Andrew Duke of Croatia and Dalmatia as an appanage. 

Andrew continued to conspire against Emeric, although Pope Innocent III continued urging Andrew to launch a crusade. On 10 March 1199, Emeric forced Boleslaus, Bishop of Vác, who was a supporter of Andrew, to give him documents that proved the conspiracy against him. In the summer of that year, Emeric defeated Andrew's army near Lake Balaton, which made Andrew flee to Austria. A papal legate named Gregory arrived in Hungary to mediate a reconciliation between the two brothers. According to the brothers' treaty, Emeric once again granted Croatia and Dalmatia to Andrew in the summer of 1200.

Wars in the Balkans (1200–1203)

From around 1200, Emeric was deeply involved in the affairs of the Balkan Peninsula. On 11 October 1200, Pope Innocent urged him to take measures to liquidate the "heretics" in Bosnia. Upon Emeric's request, the Pope refused to send a royal crown to Grand Prince Stephen of Serbia. Emeric invaded Serbia in 1201 or 1202, and helped Stephen's brother Vukan seize the throne. As a token of his suzerainty over Serbia, Emeric became the first Hungarian monarch to adopt the title of King of Serbia in 1202. He was also the first king to use a royal seal depicting the so-called "Árpád stripes", which eventually became part of the coat of arms of Hungary.

In the summer of 1202, the Venetian doge Enrico Dandolo signed a treaty with the leaders of the Fourth Crusade, who agreed to help the Venetians recapture Zadar, a town in Dalmatia, which had accepted the Hungarian monarchs' suzerainty since 1186. Even though Pope Innocent III forbade the crusaders to besiege Zadar, they seized the town on 24 November and gave it to the Venetians. Although the Pope excommunicated the Venetians and the crusaders upon Emeric's demand, Zadar remained under Venetian rule.

In fear of a crusade by Emeric, Ban Kulin of Bosnia held a synod of the Church of Bosnia at Bilino Polje on 6 April 1203. The synod acknowledged papal primacy and ordered the reform of the rites. Kulin also acknowledged Emeric's suzerainty. In a letter written in 1203, the Bulgarian tsar Kaloyan informed Pope Innocent that Emeric had occupied five districts in Bulgaria, and Kaloyan demanded the Pope's intervention.

Last years (1203–1204)

Duke Andrew once again rose up in open rebellion against Emeric in the autumn of 1203. Their armies met at Varaždin on the river Drava in October. Emeric walked into his brother's camp unarmed, stating, "Now I shall see who will dare to raise a hand to shed the blood of the royal lineage!", according to the nearly contemporaneous Thomas the Archdeacon. Nobody ventured to stop the king; thus, he approached Andrew and seized him without resistance. Duke Andrew was held in captivity for months, but his supporters released him in early 1204. 

Taking advantage of the civil war in Hungary, Kaloyan invaded and captured Belgrade, Barancs (now Braničevo in Serbia), and other fortresses. Emeric made preparations for a campaign against Bulgaria, but he disbanded his army upon Pope Innocent's demand. The Pope, who had been negotiating a church union with Kaloyan, sent a royal crown to him, but Emeric imprisoned the papal legate who was delivering the crown to Bulgaria when the legate was passing through Hungary.  

Having fallen seriously ill, Emeric had his four-year-old son, Ladislaus, crowned king on 26 August 1204. He also released the papal legate. He reconciled with his brother, "entrusting to him the guardianship of his son and the administration of the entire kingdom until the ward should reach the age of majority", according to Thomas the Archdeacon. Emeric died on 30 November, according to the Illuminated Chronicle. Emeric was buried in the cathedral of Eger.

Family

Emeric's wife, Constance, was the daughter of King Alfonso II of Aragon. Their marriage took place between 1196 and 1200. Their only known child, Ladislaus, was born around 1200 and died on 7 May 1205. Queen Constance, who outlived both her husband and their son, was later married to Frederick II, Holy Roman Emperor.

Notes

Sources

Primary sources

Archdeacon Thomas of Split: History of the Bishops of Salona and Split (Latin text by Olga Perić, edited, translated and annotated by Damir Karbić, Mirjana Matijević Sokol and James Ross Sweeney) (2006). CEU Press. .
The Hungarian Illuminated Chronicle: Chronica de Gestis Hungarorum (Edited by Dezső Dercsényi) (1970). Corvina, Taplinger Publishing. .

Secondary sources

Further reading

 
 

|-

|-

House of Árpád
Kings of Hungary
Kings of Croatia
History of Dalmatia
1174 births
1204 deaths
12th-century Hungarian people
13th-century Hungarian people
Dukes of Slavonia